Grigor Kerdikoshvili (born 15 November 1994 in Georgia) is a Georgian rugby union player who plays for  in the Rugby Pro D2. His playing position is lock. He made his debut for Georgia in 2019 against Spain.

Reference list

External links
itsrugby.co.uk profile

1994 births
Georgia international rugby union players
Living people
Rugby union locks
American Raptors players
SU Agen Lot-et-Garonne players
People from Gori, Georgia
Rugby union players from Georgia (country)
The Black Lion players